Mahoor Shahzad (born 17 October 1996) is a Pakistani badminton player. She has competed at the 2014 Asian Games, and also at the 2018 and 2022 Commonwealth Games.

She also represented Pakistan at the 2020 Summer Olympics in Tokyo after receiving a tripartite invitation, thus becoming the first Pakistani badminton player to compete at the Olympic Games. She was also Pakistan's flag bearer at the opening ceremony along with Muhammad Khalil Akhtar.

Education 
Shahzad graduated  from the Institute of Business Administration, Karachi in 2018, with Economics and Mathematics as her subjects.

Career 
Shahzad began playing badminton in 2008 in Karachi. Shahzad is a six-time national badminton champion of Pakistan. She won the women's singles titles at the 2017 and 2019 editions of the Pakistan International Series.

Achievements

BWF International Challenge/Series (2 titles, 3 runners-up) 
Women's singles

Women's doubles

  BWF International Challenge tournament
  BWF International Series tournament
  BWF Future Series tournament

Personal life 
Shahzad's father, Muhammad Shahzad, is an indoor rower athlete. Her sister, Rabia Shahzad, is a weightlifter who has won several international medals for Pakistan.

Controversy 
During 2020 Summer Olympics, Shahzad posted a video in which she was seen saying that while she has received praise for her achievements, there were some local badminton players who were jealous of her and acted like "Pathans". She received a lot of criticism for ridiculing her fellow players and by extension, an entire ethnicity. After the backlash, she posted another video and apologized.

References

External links 
 

1996 births
Living people
Racket sportspeople from Karachi
Pakistani female badminton players
Badminton players at the 2018 Commonwealth Games
Badminton players at the 2022 Commonwealth Games
Commonwealth Games competitors for Pakistan
Badminton players at the 2014 Asian Games
Badminton players at the 2018 Asian Games
Asian Games competitors for Pakistan
South Asian Games bronze medalists for Pakistan
South Asian Games medalists in badminton
Institute of Business Administration, Karachi alumni
Badminton players at the 2020 Summer Olympics
Olympic badminton players of Pakistan